Two Hands is the second studio album by English hard rock band Turbowolf. It was produced by Tom Dalgety and released through Spinefarm Records/Search and Destroy Records on 6 April 2015.

Track listing

Chart positions

References 

2015 albums
Universal Music Group albums
Turbowolf albums